The 2012 Calderdale Metropolitan Borough Council election took place on 3 May 2012 to elect members of Calderdale Metropolitan Borough Council in West Yorkshire, England. This was on the same day as other 2012 United Kingdom local elections. After the election the council continued to have no overall control and continue to be run by a coalition between the Labour Party and the Liberal Democrats.

The Warley Councillor Keith Hutson stepped down in 2012 due to health reasons. A by-election was held on 19 July 2012. The seat was held by the Liberal Democrats with James Baker winning the seat.

In this year Councillor Nader Fekri for Calder ward defected to Labour from the Liberal Democrats in 2012 saying that he could no longer support the coalition in the national parliament with the Conservatives.

In April 2013 the coalition between Labour and the Liberal Democrats collapsed as Labour pulled out over disagreements over benefit cuts. Labour continued to run the council as a minority administration.

Council composition
Prior to the election the composition of the council was:

After the election the composition of the council was:

Ward results

Brighouse ward

The incumbent was Howard Blagbrough for the Conservative Party.

Calder ward

The incumbent was Janet Battye for the Liberal Democrats.

Elland ward

The incumbent was Pat Allen for the Liberal Democrats.

Greetland & Stainland ward

The incumbent was Keith Watson for the Conservative Party.

Hipperholme & Lightcliffe ward

The incumbent was Graham Hall for the Conservative Party.

Illingworth & Mixenden ward

The incumbent was Tom Bates, an independent.

Luddendenfoot ward

The incumbent was Christine Bampton-Smith for the Liberal Democrats.

Northowram & Shelf ward

The incumbent was Graham Hall for the Conservative Party.

Ovenden ward

The incumbent was Danielle Coombs for the Labour Party.

Park ward

The incumbent was Mohammad Ilyas for the Liberal Democrats.

Rastrick ward

The incumbent was Ann McAllister for the Conservative Party.

Ryburn ward

The incumbent was Geraldine Carter for the Conservative Party.

Skircoat ward

The incumbent was John Hardy for the Conservative Party.

Sowerby Bridge ward

The incumbent was Amanda Byrne for the Conservative Party.

Todmorden ward

The incumbent was Ian Cooper for the Conservative Party.

Town ward

The incumbent was Megan Swift for the Labour Party.

Warley ward

The incumbent was Robert Pearson, an independent Liberal Democrat.

By-elections between 2012 and 2014

Warley ward, 2012

References

2012 English local elections
2012
2010s in West Yorkshire